Emin Аhmed (born 10 March 1996) is a Bulgarian footballer of Turkish descent who plays as a right-back for Botev Galabovo.

Career

Beroe 
Ahmed bеgan his career in Beroe Stara Zagora. On 23 September 2015 he made his debut for the team for the Bulgarian Cup against Svetkavitsa Targovishte. 4 days later he made his official debut in the A Group for the team.

Nesebar (loan) 
In February 2017, Ahmed was loaned to Nesebar until the end of the season.

Vereya (loan) 
On 20 June 2018, Ahmed was loaned to local rivals Vereya until the end of the year.

Career statistics

Club

References

External links

Living people
1996 births
Bulgarian footballers
Bulgaria under-21 international footballers
Association football defenders
PFC Beroe Stara Zagora players
PFC Nesebar players
FC Vereya players
FC Dunav Ruse players
FC Lokomotiv Gorna Oryahovitsa players
FC Botev Galabovo players
First Professional Football League (Bulgaria) players
Second Professional Football League (Bulgaria) players
Bulgarian people of Turkish descent
People from Kardzhali Province